Débora Oakley González (born 11 August 1980 in Mexico City) is a Mexican rower. She competed in the single sculls race at the 2012 Summer Olympics and placed 4th in Final D and 22nd overall.

References

1980 births
Living people
Mexican female rowers
Olympic rowers of Mexico
Rowers at the 2012 Summer Olympics
Rowers from Mexico City
Rowers at the 2011 Pan American Games
Pan American Games competitors for Mexico